The Children Are Watching Us is a 1943 Italian drama film directed by Vittorio De Sica.

Plot
Pricò is a young Italian boy who lives with his parents in a middle-class household.  His mother, Nina, takes him to a local park where he enjoys his time out while watching a puppet show, but is also concerned with a handsome lover named Roberto (with whom Nina has shared a past romance) courting his mother while he is assumed to not be paying attention.  As the boy returns home, the family has dinner while Pricò reflects on his day in the park.  Later that night, after his mother puts him to bed, she runs off with the stranger, leaving Pricò's father distressed at the idea of having to raise his son himself.  While their neighbors share a number of rumors concerning the disappearance of Nina, it is quickly agreed that she ran off with another man.  While concerned with her disappearance, Nina quickly returns to the home after a few days for the sake of their son.  While the father, Andrea, is not entirely pleased with this arrangement, he relents so that his son may grow up in the same house as his mother.

To distance herself from Roberto, Nina and Andrea agree to go on vacation with their son to a nearby beach hotel.  The vacation occupies their time, seemingly happy with the prospect of a reunion.  After Andrea says that he must go back home to his job, he suggests that Nina stay with Pricò a few extra days that they may enjoy their time.  After leaving, Nina is again pursued by Roberto who shows up unexpectedly at a hotel dance, at first successfully keeping him away.  But after yielding to him once again, Pricò is dismayed by her lack of faith.  After Pricò runs away, he is eventually brought back by the police officers while the hotel residents quickly start their own rumors as to the cause of his departing.

After Pricò and his mother return to their home town, Nina tells him outside their home to go on up and that she'll be up after going on an errand.  When Pricò goes to see his father upstairs, he and his father realize the truth of why Nina is not there.  Again distressed at the elopement of his wife, Andrea enrolls Pricò in a boarding school.  While his son is away, Andrea kills himself in despair.  When Pricò is told of the death at the school, both his mother and faithful maid are there to comfort him.  Though very young, Pricò understands the nature of his mother, refusing to go to her for comfort in favor of his maid.  The film ends with Pricò walking off, refusing to acknowledge his mother.

Cast
 Emilio Cigoli - Andrea - il padre
 Giovanna Cigoli - Agnese - la governante
 Olinto Cristina - Il rettore - The Chancellor
 Luciano De Ambrosis - Pricò
 Jone Frigerio - La nonna (as Ione Frigerio)
 Mario Gallina - Il medico
 Maria Gardena - La signora Uberti
 Zaira La Fratta - Paolina
 Armando Migliari - Il commendatore
 Guido Morisi - Gigi Sbarlani
 Nicoletta Parodi - Giuliana
 Dina Perbellini - Zia Berelli
 Isa Pola - Nina - la madre
 Adriano Rimoldi - Roberto - l'amante di Nina
 Tecla Scarano - La signora Resta (Mrs. Resta)

References

External links
 
 
 The Children Are Watching Us: A Movement Is Born an essay by Peter Brunette at the Criterion Collection

1943 films
1943 drama films
Italian black-and-white films
1940s Italian-language films
Films about children
Films about suicide
Films directed by Vittorio De Sica
Films with screenplays by Cesare Zavattini
Italian drama films
Films set in Italy
Films scored by Renzo Rossellini
1940s Italian films